Mirrorwork may refer to:

 Shisha or mirrorwork, see Embroidery of India#Shisha or Mirrorwork (Gujarat, Haryana, Rajasthan)
 Mirrorwork (album), an album by Alastair Galbraith